Digest Writer is a Pakistani drama series which premiered on Hum TV on 5 October 2014. The serial is penned by Umera Ahmad and directed by Syed Ahmed Kamran. It stars Saba Qamar, Agha Ali and Gohar Rasheed.

It received seven nominations at the annual Hum TV awards.

Plot

Digest Writer is based on the life of Farida, a lower-middle-class college student whose parents prefer to focus on the education of their son who they wish to become a doctor. Farida herself is a talented young woman, determined to do well in life. She is a reserved outcast within her family, dreaming of her own future and success, holding to the belief "whatever you're destined to achieve, you will achieve" (translated into English). At the same time, Farida's family are going through financially difficult times as she aspires to become a Digest magazine writer under the pen name "Rashk-i-Hina" (Pride of Henna), spending sleepless nights to accomplish her dream. Indeed her father constantly scolds her for wasting electricity at night but she continues regardless. Farida is determined to earn money to help the family get out of their financial crisis, and seeing this her parents become more sympathetic toward her. She goes on to befriends a banker, Shehryar Ahmed, who admires her skills, but several problems arise in their relationship.

Farida's parents wish to wed her to a cousin, Shaukat, who at the start feigns a lot of affection towards her. Farida's father forces her to marry Shaukat, although later on discovers that he has made a terrible mistake; once married to him, Farida suffers taunts by Shaukat's family, especially in relation to her dream of becoming a digest writer. Shaukat rapes Farida to prevent her from planning to escape the marriage and restricts her from even touching a pen. At the same time, Farida receives a call from a tv channel (who have adapted her writing) to inform her about the  success of her drama and propose their wish to have her write two more dramas. Farida refuses due to her family situation. Days go by and Farida finds out she is having a baby.

When the baby is born, her aunt is upset as it's a girl. Farida wants to name her child Meerab, but her aunt names the baby after her own mother, Suraya. Later on, the family fall on hard times as Shaukat's father has an accident. The family is short on money so they ask Farida to start writing again, but they want to keep all the money to themselves. Farida, on the other hand, wants to give some money to them and some to her mum. When Shaukat finds out, his mother becomes enraged at her. Then one night, Farida finds another woman's earring in her bedroom and confronts Shaukat the next day. He admits to seeing another woman, but claims it is because Farida is too busy in housework and has no time for him. Farida packs her bags and goes to her parent's house. Shaukat's family are not able to run their household without an income, so they convince Farida to return.

Time shifts to eight years on, and Farhan (Farida's brother) is now a doctor and the family is wealthy. Farida has a son called Fahad and has become a well-known drama writer. One day, she goes to the mall and finds Shehryar there. They both talk and Farida admits to her not marrying him because she was forced to marry Shaukat. They secretly meet and Farida subsequently asks Shaukat for a divorce. She has to make a difficult decision:  stay with Shaukat or marry the now seemingly more self-centred Shehryar. She decides to stay with Shaukat because of the children's preference to stay with their birth parents instead of living with some other person. Shaukat mends his ways, and Farida eventually returns his love. The story ends here.

Cast
 Saba Qamar as Fareeda/Rashk-e-Hina
 Gohar Rasheed as Shaukat
 Maheen Khalid Rizvi as Jameela
 Khalid Ahmed as Mazhar Hayat
 Zhalay Sarhadi as Rida Anmol
 Farhan Ali Agha as Sikandar
 Aiman Khan as Shakeela
 Kashif Mehmood as Ayaan Junaid
 Mizna Waqas as Fareeda's college friend
 Agha Ali as Sheheryar
 Mehmood Akhtar as Anwar
 Sajida Syed as Zareena
 Parveen Akbar as Sajida
 Sarah Umair as Mahroosh
Saife Hassan as Rehaan Khan
 Ali Anwar as Dr Farhan
 Ghazala Javed as Bint e Hawa

Home media and digital release 
The drama serial was released on Indian OTT platform MX Player. In July 2019, it was uploaded on Hum TV's official YouTube channel with muted music to avoid copyright infringement, which also irritatingly impacted on the dialogue, a fact which may have contributed to falling viewer numbers.

Reception
Umera Ahmad was a renowned author at the time and her name was big enough to attract a large audience; she wrote the screenplay. The serial received generally positive reviews and continues to maintain its position in the top ten of Pakistani serials.

Its first episode received a TRP of 4.1, and in its fourth episode the drama gained 5 TRPs. By the fifth episode, however, the ratings dropped to 3.9, nevertheless a high TRP and a stable position. The ratings picked up again and gained more positive reviews as viewers tuned in. The show managed to come first in the top ten at one time. The team was praised for their wonderful acting, directing, and story-writing. The show was immensely popular due to its strong cast and relatable storyline. Its first episode ratings were an exceptional achievement, but the show lagged behind by with the emergence of Sadqay Tumhare on the same channel, albeit shown on a different day and in a different time-slot. Although Sadqay Tumhare began with a higher TRP, this later dropped drastically whereas Digest Writer managed to keep its consistent. Overall the drama was a mega hit for Hum TV in 2014–2015.The show was very popular in the United Kingdom usually being the most watched show on Hum TV and several times 'most watched' of all the channels. According to exclusive data obtained by BizAsia, the 22nd Episode pulled in 116,300 viewers – peaking at 160,700 viewers.

See also
 Digest magazine
 Henna

References

 Shuaa Digests 2016

External links

Pakistani drama television series
2014 Pakistani television series debuts
2015 Pakistani television series endings
Urdu-language television shows
Hum TV original programming
Hum TV